The 2014 Indian general election in Rajasthan were held for 25 seats in the state. The major two contenders in the state were Bharatiya Janta Party (BJP) and the Indian National Congress (INC). The voting process was held in two phases on 17 and 24 April 2014.

Result

|- align=center
!style="background-color:#E9E9E9" class="unsortable"|
!style="background-color:#E9E9E9" align=center|Political Party
!style="background-color:#E9E9E9" |Seats won
!style="background-color:#E9E9E9" |Seat change
|-
| 
|align="left"|Bharatiya Janata Party||25|| 21
|-
|
|align="left"|Total||25||
|}

List of elected MPs
Keys:

Bye-elections

References

Indian general elections in Rajasthan
2010s in Rajasthan
2014 Indian general election by state or union territory